Claude William Willoughby (November 14, 1898 in Buffalo, Kansas – August 14, 1973 in McPherson, Kansas), was a professional baseball player who was a pitcher in the major leagues from  to . He played for the Philadelphia Phillies and Pittsburgh Pirates.

In 219 games pitched, 101 which were starts, Willoughby recorded a 38-58 won-loss record with a 5.84 earned run average and 175 strikeouts in  innings pitched over seven seasons.

External links

1898 births
1973 deaths
Bartlesville Oilers players
Baseball players from Kansas
Davenport Blue Sox players
Little Rock Travelers players
Major League Baseball pitchers
Milwaukee Brewers (minor league) players
Minor league baseball managers
New Orleans Pelicans (baseball) players
People from Wilson County, Kansas
Philadelphia Phillies players
Pittsburgh Pirates players
San Francisco Seals (baseball) players
Waterloo Hawks (baseball) players